Stand Up to Cancer (SU2C) is a charitable program of the Entertainment Industry Foundation (EIF). SU2C aims to raise significant funds for translational cancer research through online and televised efforts. Central to the program is a telethon that was first televised by four major broadcast networks (ABC, NBC, CBS, Fox) in over 170 countries on September 5, 2008. SU2C raised over $100 million after that evening's broadcast. Funds collected by Stand Up to Cancer are then distributed by the American Association for Cancer Research.

History 
Stand Up to Cancer was conceived of in autumn 2007, by a group of women who had been affected by cancer and believe that by merging the recourse of the media and entertainment industries into a single operation they would be able to fight against this disease in a more profound way.

Stand Up to Cancer was formally launched on May 27, 2008. Current members of the SU2C Council of Founders and Advisors (CFA) include Katie Couric, Sherry Lansing, Kathleen Lobb, Lisa Paulsen, Rusty Robertson, Sue Schwartz, Pamela Oas Williams, and Ellen Ziffren. All current members of the CFA were co-producers of the 2012 televised special. The late co-founder Laura Ziskin executive produced both the September 5, 2008 and September 10, 2010 broadcasts. Sung Poblete, Ph.D., R.N., has served as SU2C’s president and CEO since 2011. In the United Kingdom, Channel 4, along with Cancer Research UK, launched its own version of Stand Up to Cancer in October 2012, which has continued every year since.

Initiative 
Stand Up to Cancer aims to raise awareness and bring about an understanding that everyone is connected to cancer. The statistic used most often by SU2C is from the American Cancer Society: one out of every two men and one out of every three women will be diagnosed with cancer in their lifetime, meaning everyone is affected in some way, or will be.

The campaign has featured televised moments during World Series baseball games where fans literally "stand up to cancer" by rising and holding signs inscribed with the names of friends and loved ones who have struggled with the disease.

Research teams funded
SU2C has donated hundreds of millions of dollars since the first "Dream Team" was organized in 2009. The "Dream Teams" funded by SU2C brings researchers together from institutions and universities across the world and have been among the most productive collaborations in getting new drugs to market and many teams are funded jointly with other cancer research organizations. The research is required to be translational and include laboratory and clinical members and cannot involve more than one principal investigator from each institution. Many of these dream teams are co-sponsored by other cancer-related foundations.

 SU2C-CRUK-Lustgarten Foundation Pancreatic Cancer Dream Team: Reprogramming of Transcriptional Circuitry to Control Pancreatic Cancer ($12 million)
 Led by Daniel Von Hoff, Ronald M. Evans, Gerard Evan
 Stand Up to Cancer (SU2C)-Dutch Cancer Society Dream Team: Molecular Early Detection of Colorectal Cancer (MEDOCC)
 Led by Gerrit A. Meijer, Victor Velculescu
 SU2C-Ovarian Cancer Research Fund Alliance-National Ovarian Cancer Coalition Dream Team: DNA Repair Therapies for Ovarian Cancer
 Led by Alan D’Andrea, Elizabeth Swisher
 The SU2C-ACS Lung Cancer Dream Team: Targeting KRAS Mutant Lung Cancers
 Led by Jeffrey Engelman, Jedd D. Wolchok
 Tumor Organoids: A New Preclinical Model for Drug Sensitivity Analysis
 Led by Hans Clevers, Hans Bos
 The SU2C-The Lustgarten Foundation Pancreatic Cancer Convergence Dream Team: Transforming Pancreatic Cancer to Treatable Disease
 Led by Elizabeth M. Jaffee, Robert H. Vonderheide
 SU2C-St. Baldrick’s Pediatric Cancer Dream Team: Immunogenomics to Create New Therapies for High-Risk Childhood Cancers

 Led by John M. Maris, Crystal L. Mackall

 SU2C-CRI Dream Team: Immunologic Checkpoint Blockade and Adoptive Cell Transfer in Cancer Therapy
 Led by James P. Allison, Antoni Ribas, Drew Pardoll, Cassian Yee
 SU2C-PCF2 Dream Team: Targeting Adaptive Pathways in Metastatic Treatment-Resistant Prostate Cancer
 Led by Eric J. Small, Owen Witte
 SU2C-PCF Dream Team: Precision Therapy for Advanced Prostate Cancer
 Led by Arul Chinnaiyan, Charles L. Sawyers
 SU2C-MRA Dream Team: Personalized Medicine for Patients with BRAF Wild-Type Cancer
 Led by Jeffrey Trent, Patricia M. LoRusso
 An Integrated Approach to Targeting Breast Cancer Molecular Subtypes and their Resistance Phenotype
 Led by Joe W. Gray, Dennis Slamon
 The VARI-SU2C Epigenetics Dream Team ll
 Led by Peter A. Jones, Stephen B. Baylin
 Bioengineering and Clinical Applications of Circulating Tumor Cell Chip
 Led by Daniel Haber, Mehmet Toner
 Cutting off the Fuel Supply: A New Approach to the Treatment of Pancreatic Cancer ($22 million)
 Led by Craig B. Thompson, Daniel Von Hoff
 Targeting PI3K in Women’s Cancers
 Led by Gordon B. Mills, Lewis C. Cantley
 SU2C-Lustgarten Foundation Chimeric Antigen Receptor T Cell (CAR-T) Translational Research Team
 Led by Carl June, E. John Wherry, Shelley L. Berger
 SU2C Colorectal Cancer Dream Team: Targeting Genomic, Metabolic and Immunological Vulnerabilities of Colorectal Cancer
 Led by Charles S. Fuchs, Zhenghe Wang, Lewis C. Cantley, Luis A. Diaz Jr

Research led by these teams has contributed to the development of two FDA-approved treatments; palbociclib (Breast Cancer Dream Team), and abraxane plus gemcitabine (Pancreatic Cancer Dream Team).

United States

Six telethons have been broadcast in the United States and are made available to more than 190 countries. To date, more than $603 million has been pledged to support SU2C’s innovative cancer research programs.

The first Stand Up to Cancer event was held on September 5, 2008, raising over $100 million.  The second was held on 10 September 2010. The third was held on 7 September 2012, and the fourth was held on 5 September 2014, presented by Gwyneth Paltrow and Katie Couric from Los Angeles. The fifth was held on 9 September 2016.  The averaged combined ratings for the 2014 telethon were 1.8 from 2.1 in 2012. The sixth was broadcast on 7 September 2018, raising more than $123 million. This event was aired on more than 70 broadcast and cable networks and streaming and social platforms, including: CBS, HBO and NBC.

In Canada, the 2014 telethon aired September 5, 2014 in simultaneous substitution (in many areas) with the American telethon, simultaneously on English language networks CBC Television, City, CTV and Global, as well as CHCH-DT in Hamilton, Ontario, CHEK-DT in Victoria, British Columbia, CJON-DT in St. John's, Newfoundland and Labrador, and specialty channels TLN, Fight Network, Gusto TV, AMI-TV and the Hollywood Suite channels. The Canadian broadcast of the telethon benefits EIF Canada, the Canadian arm of the Entertainment Industry Foundation, with all donations benefiting cancer research in Canada.

It was not held in the fall of 2020 due to the COVID-19 pandemic, but postponed to August 21, 2021.

United Kingdom

On 19 October 2012, Channel 4 in the United Kingdom aired their first telethon for Stand Up to Cancer hosted by Davina McCall and Alan Carr along with Dr. Christian Jessen. A second telethon was broadcast on 17 October 2014, again hosted by McCall and Carr along with Dr. Jessen. Subsequent UK telethons, again on Channel 4, followed in 2016 and 2018.

Stand Up to Cancer's fundraising activities in the UK include the London 3 Peaks Challenge, which involves participants running up the stairs of Heron Tower, 30 St Mary Axe and 200 Aldersgate before abseiling down the outside of 200 Aldersgate.

Despite the Original American version cancelling their telethon and ITV giving up on their Text Santa shows, Channel 4 have still scheduled a telethon over the last two years, in addition to a number of other charity celebrity specials on the network. The most recent one was held on 15 October 2021, and was hosted by Alan Carr, Adam Hills, Maya Jama and Davina McCall. In addition to this, Channel 4 will be bringing back a version of the British Comedy Awards for Stand Up to Cancer, with the renamed National Comedy Awards due to be held in London on 15 December 2021.

References

External links
 Stand Up to Cancer website
 Stand Up to Cancer Canada website

Cancer fundraisers
Charities based in Canada 
Cancer charities in the United States
Charities based in California
2008 television specials
Online magazines published in Canada
Magazines established in 2008
International broadcasting
Simulcasts
Annual events in the United States
American annual television specials
Annual television shows
2008 American television series debuts
Cancer organizations based in Canada 
2014 television specials
Television Academy Honors winners